Berndorf may refer to several places:

Berndorf, Rhineland-Palatinate, in Rhineland-Palatinate, Germany
Berndorf, part of Twistetal, Hesse, Germany
Berndorf, Lower Austria, Austria
Berndorf bei Salzburg, a town in the district of Salzburg-Umgebung in Austria